John Grey Hoben (May 6, 1884 – July 5, 1915), also known as Jack Hoben, was an American rower who competed in the 1904 Summer Olympics. During the games, he won a silver medal in the double sculls rowing event.

References

External links
 John Hoben's profile at databaseOlympics
 John Hoben's profile at Sports Reference.com

1884 births
1915 deaths
Rowers at the 1904 Summer Olympics
Olympic silver medalists for the United States in rowing
American male rowers
Medalists at the 1904 Summer Olympics